Spirama glaucescens is a species of moth of the family Erebidae. It is found in the Democratic Republic of Congo (East Kasai, Katanga), Malawi, Mozambique, Tanzania, Zambia and Zimbabwe.

Like other species of genus Spirama, S. glaucescens has a pattern on the wings when the moth is resting that looks like the face of a snake with slightly opened mouth.

References

External links

Moths described in 1893
Spirama